The Global Center for Advanced Studies (GCAS ) is an educational and research institution located in New York City and Dublin. It is known for its seminars with the world's leading philosophers, journalists, artists, academics, and public figures. GCAS is governed by a board of directors. Later in 2017, GCAS incorporated as a private limited company GCAS College Dublin, Limited in order to create a co-owned college among faculty, staff, financial supporters, and graduates making GCAS College the first co-owned, accredited college in history.

History 
The Global Center for Advanced Studies was originally incorporated in the state of Colorado on August 22, 2013, by Creston C Davis (currently Professor of Philosophy and Psychoanalysis and Chancellor at GCAS College Dublin), as an institute of higher learning based on critical theory, and on the concept of a "debt free education grounded in the principles of Democracy and the Commons.” Creston Davis hired Jason M. Adams on September 23, 2013 as a co-director, later Adams withdrew from GCAS.

The GCAS was subsequently relocated to Grand Rapids, Michigan and incorporated in Michigan on November 27, 2013 as a non-profit organization. The Colorado corporation was voluntarily dissolved on February 26, 2014. In 2017 Creston Davis and Tere Vaden, PhD incorporated GCAS in Dublin, Ireland as GCAS Research Institute Ireland, and in 2018 as GCAS College Dublin, Limited.

From 2014–15, Alain Badiou assumed the role of Honorary President at GCAS. Azfar Hussain joined GCAS as its Honorary Vice-President in 2013 and is still working in that capacity. On July 16–19, 2015, a GCAS conference called "Democracy Rising World Conference 2015" took place in Athens. In autumn 2015, GCAS partnered with two institutions of higher education in Europe, the Alma Mater Europaea-European Center Maribor (AMEU-ECM) and the Institutum Studiorum Humanitatis (ISH).  In 2017, Lewis Gordon, Ph.D., Professor of Philosophy at UCONN-Storrs, assumed the role of Honorary President at GCAS.

In 2017, The Global Center for Advanced Studies formally ended its academic partnership with Alma Mater Europaea-European Center Maribor and ISH owing to ideological difference surrounding charging tuition and breaking with the GCAS model of debt-free education. The researchers, faculty, and staff of GCAS opted to found an independent research institute in Dublin, Ireland, formally re-naming the institute GCAS-Research Institute, Ireland (GCAS-RII).

Academics
After ending its academic partnership with Alma Mater Europaea-European Center Maribor, the GCAS formally applied for accreditation with the Irish government. The institute's application for accreditation remains under review. The GCAS academic structure is divided into ten institutes: Critical Philosophy, Critical Media and Cultural Studies, Arts, Humanities and Social Sciences, Policy Studies, Critical Theology, Psychoanalysis, Global Studies, Political Economy and Critical Pedagogy; and a Forms and Formalization Research Group (FFRG) on Formal Ontology. The institute provides both online and in-residence courses that can be audited or taken towards earning a Bachelor of Arts, Master of Arts (M.A.), or Doctor of Philosophy (Ph.D.) in Social and Political Thought. In 2017, the institute launched an open enrollment E-School that hosts a variety of eLearning courses in subjects associated with the institutes within the GCAS framework. In 2018, GCAS began offering a Certificate  program in Philosophy & Psychoanalysis. All degrees and certificates are conferred independently by GCAS from its Dublin Research Institute and subject to validation from the European Qualifications Framework in Ireland.

The organization affiliates itself with some of the most prominent academic professors in the world including, among others, Joan Copjec, Simon Critchley, Enrique Dussel, Arif Dirlik, Bracha L. Ettinger, Henry Giroux, Richard Kearney, Antonio Negri, Jean-Luc Nancy, Avital Ronell, Gayatri Spivak, and Gianni Vattimo, while past faculty members include Alain Badiou and Slavoj Žižek who remain as Affiliate Faculty. In addition to a Core Faculty, the GCAS includes a roster of international Affiliate Professors that are considered top tier representatives of their fields and support the GCAS mission.

Since its inception, GCAS held over 400 different meetings, classes, workshops and conferences, in which GCAS taught and engaged with over 100,000 people world-wide from more than 80 different countries. Events' locations range from The Centre Pompidou in Paris to Berlin, New York, Athens, Grand Rapids, and Cincinnati; engaging with live lectures from Oliver Stone, Gayatri Chakravorty Spivak, Alain Badiou, Farhang Erfani, Tariq Ali, Antonio Negri, Zoe Konstantopoulou, Jean-Luc Nancy, Bracha L. Ettinger, Eric Toussaint, Documenta’s Adam Szymczyk, Azfar Hussain, Sigrid Hackenberg, Adrian Parr, Brad Evans, Clayton Crockett, John D. Caputo, Paul Mason, Leo Panitch, Jodi Dean, Bruno Bosteels, Francesca Coin, Giovanni Tusa, Lori Marso, Pete Rollins, Agata Bielik-Robson, William Desmond, Fragkiska Megaloudi, Jeffrey Robbins, Catherine Keller, Carl Reschke, George Katsiaficas, Shon Meckfessel, Graham Priest, Michael Hardt, Henry Giroux, Debt-Strike’s Andrew Ross, Costas Lapavitsas, Astra Taylor, and via the Žižek Studies conference with forthcoming lectures by Noam Chomsky, Pulitzer Prize winner Chris Hedges, Lisa Duggan, and Richard D. Wolff, among others.

See also
 Chicago Theological Seminary
 European Graduate School

Notes and references

External links
 GCAS website (old website )
 GCAS blog (old blog)
 "What is the Global Center for Advanced Studies?" by Creston Davis
 GCAS Facebook page
 GCAS - About Us 
 GCAS Research Institute Ireland website

Educational institutions established in 2013
Higher education
Education in Michigan
International educational organizations
2013 establishments in Colorado